Raiz is the second album released by fado singer Cuca Roseta. It was released in May 2013 by Universal Music Portugal. Roseta composed the music and wrote the lyrics on most of the album's songs. Mário Barreiros and Rosetta co-produced the album. It was certified as a golden disc in August 2014.

Track listing
 Fado Do Cansaço	
 Fado Da Essência	
 Fado Do Contra	
 Fado Do Abraço	
 Fado Proibido (music by Pedro Lima)
 Fado Da Vaidade (lyrics by Florbela Espanca)
 Fado Do Perdão (music by André Sardet)
 Fado Da Esperança	
 Fado Menor Isabel	
 Fado Da Entrega	
 Fado Dos Sentidos	
 Fado Do Silêncio	
 Fado De Inverno	
 Fado Da Vida (lyrics By José Avillez, music by Tozé Brito)

References

Cuca Roseta albums
2013 albums
Portuguese-language albums
Universal Music Group albums